Julia Fons de Checa (1882 – 4 January 1973) was a singer and cupletista from Spain. Born in Seville, she moved to Madrid at the age of eight. She was popular during the first quarter of the 20th century, when the género chico, operetta, cuplé, and zarzuela were favored, cultivating these genres. In 1903, she joined the Casimiro Ortas Company and was a notable performer of Madrid's Teatro Eslava. She died in Madrid in 1973.

References

1882 births
1973 deaths
People from Seville
Spanish musical theatre actresses
20th-century Spanish women opera singers
Cupletistas